Straż miejska (city guard) is the name given to the separate municipal police forces funded, directed and administered by some of the gmina (municipalities) of Poland. They operate in conjunction with the Policja, the Polish national police.

The present arrangement for municipal police in Poland was created after the fall of Communism, partly to provide a 'counterweight' to a national police force, and partly to ensure that the needs of local communities were not neglected with such a centralized agency.

City Guards have fewer powers than the Policja (for instance they do not have a power of arrest), and can only exercise what powers they have in their own municipality. They have jurisdiction over misdemeanors, supervise and protect the safety of citizens and property, and assist the Policja in public order, road safety and so on. They cannot investigate criminal cases beyond the securing of a crime scene; in the event of a major incident a City Guard must request the aid of an officer of the Policja. Straż Miejska can also perform security guard duties and transport valuables for the municipality.

They are known to be equipped with batons, handcuffs, tear gas spray and, more recently, tasers. They can also be equipped with firearms when performing municipal property security guard or valuable transporting duties.  Because of their decentralized nature, the uniforms and vehicle liveries of the City Guards vary greatly. They also have hats or caps with a characteristic yellow-black checkerboard pattern.

The Straż Miejska are similar in function to municipal police agencies in, for example, France and Spain, and to Police Community Support Officers in police forces in England and Wales in the United Kingdom as well as Handhaving in The Netherlands. The regulations also standardize the appearance of municipal police cars. Guard vehicles are to be silver in color with a distinctive stripe in the form of a three-row yellow and dark blue checkerboard. The provision applies to police cars purchased after July 1, 2012.

Rank structure

See also
Law enforcement in Poland
Municipal Police

References

Law enforcement agencies of Poland
Municipal law enforcement agencies

pl:Straż miejska